Utterby Halt was a railway halt on the East Lincolnshire Railway which served the village of Utterby in Lincolnshire between 1905 and 1961. The line through Utterby remained open for freight until December 1980.

History
The station was opened on 11 December 1905 to coincide with the introduction of a motor train service by the Great Northern Railway. It consisted of two low parallel halt platforms to the south of the level crossing over Pear Tree Lane; lamps were provided on both platforms, but only the down platform had a waiting shelter for passengers: a small wooden hut equipped with a heating stove. Passenger services called at the station upon request only. The station closed on 11 September 1961, the same day as Fotherby Halt to the south which had also opened on the same day as part of the rail motor service.

The halt is reputed to be haunted by the ghost of John Edward Lancaster, a length ganger, who was hit on the level crossing in dense fog by an oncoming Grimsby-Louth freight working in January 1953.

Present day
The halt was demolished by British Rail long before final closure of the line in December 1980 and little remains of it today. The crossing keeper's cottage survives in good condition as a private residence. Ludborough's old down distant signal post stands over the trackbed to the south towards Louth.

Future
The Lincolnshire Wolds railway is currently extending towards Utterby Halt. The extension will be opened as soon as time and money permit. A run round loop operated by a two lever ground frame will eventually be installed here and will form the southern end of the railway for some time.

However it will be some time before the level crossing will be re-instated. It is also very unlikely that a Halt will be built here as in BR days it never justified its own existence. The crossing again like Grainsby halt will probably end up being automatically worked. The old signal post will eventually be removed and restored for future use elsewhere on the railway.

Eventually once the railway reaches Louth, a passing loop might be installed here to allow two train working. This would enable one train to pass another and allow greater scope for train running.

References

Sources

Further reading

External links
 Utterby Halt on navigable O. S. map

Disused railway stations in Lincolnshire
Railway stations in Great Britain closed in 1961
Railway stations in Great Britain opened in 1905
Former Great Northern Railway stations